Huỳnh Tuấn Linh (born 17 April 1991) is a Vietnamese footballer who plays as a goalkeeper for Hoàng Anh Gia Lai. He has also played for the Vietnamese national team.

Honours
Than Quảng Ninh 
Vietnamese National Cup: 2016
Vietnamese Super Cup: 2017

External links

References

1991 births
Living people
Vietnamese footballers
Vietnam international footballers
Association football goalkeepers
V.League 1 players
Than Quang Ninh FC players
People from Quảng Ninh province